Supernaut may refer to:

"Supernaut" (song), a song by Black Sabbath on the 1972 album Black Sabbath, Vol 4
Supernaut (Australian band), an Australian glam/punk rock band from the 1970s
Supernaut (album), 1976
Supernaut (Serbian band), a Serbian alternative rock band